Sean Kingston is the eponymous debut album by Sean Kingston, released on July 31, 2007. The album was produced by J. R. Rotem. Sean Kingston, with help from Evan Bogart, wrote the songs which range from the self-deprecating-schoolboy tale of lost love in the album's most successful single "Beautiful Girls" to the much deeper "Dry Your Eyes", in which he visits the hardship of watching his mother and sister being sent to prison at the age of 15.

The album has been certified gold by the RIAA as of February 2008 with an excess of 500,000 copies.

The album entered the U.S. Billboard 200 chart at #6 and fell to #13 the following week. The album reached #2 on RIANZ in its second week.

Track listing

Sample credits
 "Me Love" - derived from the song, "D'yer Mak'er", written by Jimmy Page, Robert Plant, John Paul Jones and John Bonham; performed by Led Zeppelin.
 "Beautiful Girls" - contains portions of and features samples from the recording, "Stand by Me", written by Ben E. King, Jerry Leiber and Mike Stoller; performed by Ben E. King.
 "Got No Shorty" - contains interpolations of the composition, "I Ain't Got Nobody", written by Roger A. Graham and Spencer Williams; performed by Bing Crosby.
 "I Can Feel It" - features samples of the recording, "In the Air Tonight", written and performed by Phil Collins.
 "Colors" - contains an interpolation of the track, "Colors", written by Tracy Morrow and Charles Glenn; performed by Ice-T.
 "Take You There" - features a sample of a vocal melody from "Say It Right" by Nelly Furtado.

Notes
The original version of "Colors" is found on The Game's 2007 mixtape You Know What It Is Vol. 4 - Murda Game Chronicles and features Kingston and Rick Ross.

Charts and certifications

Weekly charts

Year-end charts

Certifications

References

External links
Sean Kingston on Myspace

2007 debut albums
Albums produced by J. R. Rotem
Sean Kingston albums
Epic Records albums